Bamberg is a city in and the county seat of Bamberg County, South Carolina, United States. The population was 3,607 at the 2010 census.

History
Bamberg is named after early resident William Seaborn Bamberg. Members of the Bamberg family continue to live in the county to this day. The Bamberg City Hall, Bamberg Historic District, Bamberg Post Office, Gen. Francis Marion Bamberg House, Cal Smoak Site, and Woodlands are listed on the National Register of Historic Places.

Geography
Bamberg is located at  (33.298440, -81.031903).

Demographics

2020 census

As of the 2020 United States census, there were 3,076 people, 1,311 households, and 684 families residing in the town.

2000 census
As of the census of 2000, there were 3,733 people, 1,383 households, and 923 families residing in the city. The population density was 1,058.1 people per square mile (408.3/km2). There were 1,537 housing units at an average density of 435.6 per square mile (168.1/km2). The racial makeup of the city was 45.22% White, 53.58% African American, 0.21% Native American, 0.32% Asian, 0.11% from other races, and 0.56% from two or more races. Hispanic or Latino people of any race were 0.48% of the population.

There were 1,383 households, out of which 31.0% had children under the age of 18 living with them, 38.2% were married couples living together, 25.5% had a female householder with no husband present, and 33.2% were non-families. 30.9% of all households were made up of individuals, and 15.5% had someone living alone who was 65 years of age or older. The average household size was 2.45 and the average family size was 3.03.

In the city, the population was spread out, with 25.7% under the age of 18, 12.6% from 18 to 24, 23.4% from 25 to 44, 21.1% from 45 to 64, and 17.3% who were 65 years of age or older. The median age was 36 years. For every 100 females, there were 82.5 males. For every 100 females age 18 and over, there were 74.8 males.

The median income for a household in the city was $21,736, and the median income for a family was $28,309. Males had a median income of $38,068 versus $20,815 for females. The per capita income for the city was $13,512. About 21.4% of families and 28.3% of the population were below the poverty line, including 37.2% of those under age 18 and 18.9% of those age 65 or over. Bamberg is the home of Mary Jane's School of Dance.

Education
Public education in Bamberg is administered by Bamberg School District One. The district operates Richard Carroll Elementary School, Bamberg-Ehrhardt Middle School and Bamberg-Ehrhardt High School.

Bamberg has a public library, a branch of the ABBE Regional Library System.

Notable people
 Justin Bamberg, state representative, and attorney in 2015 police killing of Walter Scott
 Da'Quan Bowers, former football player for Clemson University, defensive end in the NFL
 A. J. Cann, offensive lineman for the Houston Texans and former Bamberg-Ehrhardt standout
 Zack Godley, Major League baseball pitcher
 Nikki Haley, Governor of South Carolina (2011-2017), and United States Ambassador to the United Nations (2017–2018)
 Julius B. "Bubba" Ness, former Chief Justice of the South Carolina Supreme Court
 Mickey Pruitt, NFL linebacker
 Cecil T. Sandifer, funeral director and South Carolina state legislator
 Ricky Sapp, former NFL football player
 Rodney Wallace, three-time State Champion in wrestling; former UFC light heavyweight fighter and current mixed martial artist
 Mookie Wilson, Major League baseball player, 1986 World Series champion
 Preston Wilson, Major League baseball player

Climate
The climate in this area is characterized by relatively high temperatures and evenly distributed precipitation throughout the year.  According to the Köppen Climate Classification system, Bamberg has a humid subtropical climate, abbreviated "Cfa" on climate maps.

References

External links

 Bamberg City

Cities in Bamberg County, South Carolina
Cities in South Carolina